Wyżyny is a district in Bydgoszcz, Poland.

History
Construction was started in the Wyżyny district on 3 May 1971. The development was intended to house around 60,000 inhabitants and was completed in 1982. Its main architect was Andrzej Modrzejewski.

Public buildings
 Church of the Holy Polish Brothers Martyrs
 Church Matki Bożej Fatimskiej
 Church  Sacred Joseph
 "Perła" pool
 Chemik Bydgoszcz Stadium

Schools
 Elementary school number 25
 Junior High number 16
 I.J.Paderewski Junior High number 17
 Synów Pułków Junior High number 38
 High school number 9

Main streets
 Pope John Paul II
 Glinki
 Szpitalna
 Bełzy
 Perłowa
 Polish Army

References

Bydgoszcz
Neighbourhoods in Bydgoszcz